The Piano Sonata No. 10, Op. 70, was written by Alexander Scriabin in 1913.  It was his final work in this form.  The piece is highly chromatic and tonally ambiguous like Scriabin's other late works, although arguably less dissonant than most of his late works. It is characterized by frequent trills and tremolos. It is sometimes called his "Insect Sonata", referring to his words:

"My Tenth Sonata is a sonata of insects. Insects are born from the sun [...] they are the kisses of the sun."

The atmosphere of the introductory pages of the Tenth Sonata is veiled and distant, like an impressionist reflection, but much more intensely elevated and spiritual.  Trills soon sweep into every corner of the music, and in the last pages they are transformed into a glorious reverberation, as if shimmering with pulses of glowing light and taking on lives of their own. Such life and light/sound corroborations are typical of the composer's own imaginative world.

The tenth sonata is in closer dialogue with Sonata Form than some of his other sonatas. It opens with a few desolate notes, forming an augmented chord and then a diminished chord.  Then, it moves on to a simple chromatic theme, and then back to the opening theme.  Scriabin then introduces the luminous trills that pervade the rest of the piece, and then moves on to a third theme with a chromatically descending melody.  Following the sonata format, these three themes take on a modified form in the development before settling down to the recapitulation.

During the middle portion, the feverish buzzing rises to a ferocious climax that thrusts both hands' trills into the upper register of the instrument. The very first, single-line gesture of the piece is not given again until after the richly-varied "recapitulation" has been made; it arrives quite unexpectedly, and is punctuated by a falling fourth in the bass that ends on C natural -- a pitch that, in his last music, assumes great significance for Scriabin, who came to view it as a kind of cleansing tonal focus.

Like Scriabin's other sonatas, it is both technically and musically highly demanding for the pianist.  A typical performance is about 12 minutes.  Notable recorded performances of this piece include that of Scriabin’s son-in-law and musical champion, Vladimir Sofronitzky, and that of the great pianist Vladimir Horowitz, who also championed many of Scriabin’s works throughout his long career.  The Russian virtuoso Arcadi Volodos took the very unusual step of opening his Carnegie Hall debut concert with this Sonata, reflecting a daring approach to programming as well as a commitment to Scriabin’s legacy.  More recently, Yuja Wang delivered a performance of the Sonata in recital at Carnegie Hall, as well as the Philharmonie in Berlin.

References

External links
Scriabin's Tenth Sonata available for download on UBUWEB (Aspen issue no. 2 item 3), along with three preludes and introductory comments by Faubion Bowers.

Piano Sonata 10
1913 compositions